Charanga may refer to:
Charanga (Cuba), ballroom music ensemble
Charanga (Spain), wind and percussion band playing in festivities

See also
Charang, several places in Russia
Charango, a small Andean stringed instrument of the lute family